Jay Newman (February 28, 1948 – June 17, 2007) was a philosopher and Professor at the University of Guelph in Guelph, Ontario.

Biography
Newman was born in Brooklyn, New York, the son of Lou Newman and his wife, Kitty.  He received his B.A. from Brooklyn College in 1968 before acquiring his master's degree from Brown University in 1969 and his Ph.D. from York University in Toronto, Canada, in 1971.

He began teaching at the University of Guelph in 1971, where he taught until his death.  His fields of study (and his 11 books) included philosophy of religion, philosophy of culture, and the ethics of mass communication.  He became a Canadian citizen in 1986.  In 1995 he was named a Fellow of the Royal Society of Canada and he was past president of the Canadian Theological Society.  He received a Distinguished Alumnus Award of Honor from Brooklyn College in 1988 and was recipient of the 2001 University of Guelph's President's Distinguished Professor Award.  The University of Guelph has established the Jay Newman Award for Academic Integrity in his memory. In 2009, the Canadian Theological Society inaugurated the Jay Newman Memorial Lecture in the Philosophy of Religion.

Newman was a lifelong fan of the works of Gilbert and Sullivan and wrote several articles about W. S. Gilbert and the Savoy Operas.  A series of lectures about Gilbert and Sullivan-related topics have been given in his name, in New York City, by the Gilbert and Sullivan Society of New York.

He died in 2007 of cancer at age 59.

Selected publications
 Pious Pro-family Rhetoric: Postures And Paradoxes in Philosophical Perspective (2006) 
 Biblical Religion and Family Values (2001) 
 Inauthentic Culture and Its Philosophical Critics (1997) 
 Religion and Technology (1997) 
 Religion vs. Television (1996) 
 On Religious Freedom (1991) 
 Competition in Religious Life (1989) 
 The Journalist in Plato's Cave (1989) 
 Fanatics and Hypocrites (1986) 
 The Mental Philosophy of John Henry Newman (1986) 
 Foundations of Religious Tolerance (1982)

See also
American philosophy
Canadian philosophy
List of American philosophers
List of Canadian philosophers

References

External links
 

1948 births
2007 deaths
American expatriate academics
American expatriates in Canada
Jewish philosophers
People from Brooklyn
Brown University alumni
Canadian philosophers
Fellows of the Royal Society of Canada
Academic staff of the University of Guelph
York University alumni
Deaths from cancer in Ontario
Jewish American writers
Jewish Canadian writers
Philosophers of religion
Philosophers of culture
Brooklyn College alumni
20th-century American philosophers
20th-century American Jews
21st-century American Jews